Hiba Schahbaz is a Pakistani-American painter. Schahbaz was born in Karachi, Pakistan. She is known for her contemporary paintings that invoke classical styles.

Schahbaz trained as a miniaturist painter at the National College of Arts in Lahore, Pakistan, and received an MFA degree from the Pratt Institute in Brooklyn. She began her career painting with a series of miniature paintings, later expanding to larger scale works.

Schahbaz lives and works in New York.

References

External links
Hiba Schahbaz show "Dreaming" (2020)  at De Buck Gallery, NYC

1981 births
Living people
21st-century American women artists
Artists from Lahore
National College of Arts alumni
Pakistani women artists
People from Karachi
Pratt Institute alumni